Lunatic was a French hip hop duo from Boulogne-Billancourt. The lineup consisted of Booba (from Boulogne-Billancourt) and Ali (from Issy-les-Moulineaux), coming from the department of Hauts-de-Seine in the west suburb of Paris.

After Lunatic split up in 2003, both members went on to solo careers.  Their  release "Le Crime Paie" was produced by DJ Mars.

Ali 

Ali, originally Daddy Ali (born in 1975 at Issy-les-Moulineaux), is a French rapper of Moroccan origin who started his music career with Booba as rap duo Lunatic and now is a solo rapper artist.

After split-up, Ali released his album Chaos et Harmonie in 2005 collaborating with 45 Scientific.

Booba 

Elie Yaffa, better known under his stage name Booba, is a  French rapper. He became hugely successful being the most legally downloaded artist in France.

Discography: Lunatic

Albums

Singles 
1996: "Le crime paie"
1997: "Les vrais savent"

Appearances 
1996: Time Bomb – Time Bomb explose
1996: Time Bomb – Le guidon
1996: Lunatic – Le crime paie
1996: La Brigade Feat Lunatic – 16 rimes
1997: Lunatic – Les vrais savent
1997: Lunatic – Le jour J
1997: Lunatic – Chateau rouge
1997: Lunatic – Viens danser avec les Lunatic
1997: Oxmo Puccino Feat Booba – Pucc fiction
1997: Lunatic – Bouge comme un diablotin
1998: Lunatic Feat Ärsenik – Sang d'encre
1999: Lunatic Feat Comité De Brailleurs – On s'maintient
1999: Lunatic Feat Malekal Morte – Test ton mic
2000: Lunatic Feat Dicidens – De larmes et de sang
2000: Lunatic Feat Mala – Hommes de l'ombre
2002: Black Jack Feat Lunatic & Mala – Diaspora d'Afrique
2002: Lunatic – Que le message passe '
2003: Booba Feat Nessbeal – Tout c'qu'on connait

Discography: Ali 

2005: Chaos et Harmonie
2010: Le Rassemblement
2015: Que la paix soit sur vous

Discography: Booba 

2002: Temps mort
2004: Panthéon
2006: Ouest Side
2008: 0.9
2010: Lunatic
2012: Futur
2013: Futur 2.0
2015: D.U.C
2015: Nero Nemesis
2017: Trône

References 

French hip hop groups
Rappers from Hauts-de-Seine
Hip hop duos
Musical groups established in 1994
Musical groups disestablished in 2003
1994 establishments in France